Agata Dziarmagowska (born August 25, 1997), known by her stage name Dziarma (often stylized as DZIARMA) is a Polish vocalist, creating music that combines pop, hip-hop, witch house, and vaporwave.

Career 
In 2012 she made herself known to the public by taking part in the TVN show Mam talent! She reached the semi-finals stage. Then she participated in auditions for talent-show X-Factor. At the casting for the show she presented the song "Billionaire" by Travie McCoy and Bruno Mars, in which she showed not only her vocal talent, but also the ability to rap, which distinguished her from other participants. In the next stage of the program she performed Michael Jackson's hit "Billie Jean", however, by Ewa Farna's decision she dropped out at the stage of jury's houses. After participating in the X-Factor program, she signed a contract with Warner Music Poland and released her first single "Mogę wszystko, nic nie muszę". Her next single was the song "Blisko mnie", which reached gold album status in 2017.

On 30 May 2015, she was one of the main stars at the Young Stars Festival in Poznań, Poland and received the Young Stars Awards in the "debut of the year" category. In 2015 she was also nominated for the Eska Music Awards 2015 in the category "best radio debut". At the gala in Szczecin she sang two songs: "Lean On" and "President".

In June 2016, she released the single "Incomplete" and a music video, which heralded the singer's image transformation. On May 9, 2017, she released the song "Kawaii", for which she produced a music video. Her next single "Coolaid" was released on July 12, 2018. In August 2018, she made a guest appearance on Adi Nowak's track titled "Placebo", which is the third single promoting his album titled Kosh. Barvinsky and production duo Up&Down were responsible for producing the track. In December 2019, she released her debut minialbum V, which features 5 tracks. Her debut self-titled album was released on December 10, 2021 and was critically acclaimed. It peaked at 13 on Polish OLiS chart.

Discography

Albums

EPs

Singles

Guest appearances

Awards and nominations

References 

Polish musicians
Polish rappers
1997 births
Living people